Ras or RAS may refer to:

Arts and media
 RAS Records Real Authentic Sound, a reggae record label
 Rundfunk Anstalt Südtirol, a south Tyrolese public broadcasting service
 Rás 1, an Icelandic radio station 
 Rás 2, an Icelandic radio station
 Raise A Suilen, a Japanese band

Organizations
 Railway Air Services, a UK airline
 Rajasthan Administrative Service, India
 Remote Astronomical Society Observatory of New Mexico
 Richard Allen Schools, a charter school system in Ohio, USA
 Richardson Adventist School, now North Dallas Adventist Academy
 IEEE Robotics and Automation Society
 Royal Air Squadron, a flying club in the UK
 Royal American Shows, an American travelling carnival company operating from the 1920s to the 1990s
 Royal Asiatic Society of Great Britain and Ireland
 Royal Astronomical Society, UK, founded 1820
 Russian Academy of Sciences

Biology
 RAAS, the renin–angiotensin system, a hormone system that regulates blood pressure
 Recurrent aphthous stomatitis or canker sores
 Renal artery stenosis, the narrowing of the renal arteries
 Respiratory airway secretory cell, cells in humans and some other mammals that maintain airway health
 Reticular activating system in the brain, regulating wakefulness
 Retinoic acid syndrome, a complication of acute promyelocytic leukemia
 Ras superfamily, a superfamily of signalling proteins
 Ras subfamily, a family of signalling proteins

Science and technology
 .ras, a SunOS raster format
 RAS algorithm, an algorithm for iterative proportional fitting in economics
 RAS supergroup or SAR supergroup, a plant clade
 Recirculating aquaculture system, an aquarium system that filters water rather then requiring new water supplies
 Registered Accessibility Specialist, an official in Texas who evaluates accessibility
 Registration, Admission and Status, a telephony protocol under H.323
 Reliability, availability and serviceability of computer hardware
 Remote access service, on a network
 Reusable Asset Specification of software
 Row Address Strobe in dynamic random-access memory
 Russian Accounting Standards

People 

 Ras (surname), several people
 Ras, the nickname for someone with the given name of Rasmus (given name)
 Ra's al Ghul, a fictional villain in Batman media
Ras Muhamad (born 1982), Indonesian reggae singer
Nicholas Furlong (musician) or Ras
Rassius "Ras" Luine, a character from Tales of Eternia

Other uses
 Ras (fascism), a title for a regional leader in fascist Italy
 Ras (title), an Ethiopian aristocratic and court title, as in Ras Tafari
 Ras cheese, a variety popular in Egypt
 RAS syndrome, "redundant acronym syndrome" syndrome
 Rás Tailteann, an annual cycling race in Ireland
 Stari Ras, a capital city of medieval Serbian state of Raška
 Replenishment at sea, providing naval ships with supplies while at sea

See also
 Ra (disambiguation)
 Rass (disambiguation)
 Raz (disambiguation)
 Rasa (disambiguation)